The Tarai gray langur (Semnopithecus hector) is an Old World monkey, and was formerly considered a subspecies of the northern plains gray langur. The species is listed as near threatened, as there are probably not many more than 10,000 mature individuals, and it is experiencing a continuing decline.

Distribution and habitat 
The Tarai gray langur is native to northern India, Bhutan, and Nepal, and inhabits the Himalayan foothills from Rajaji National Park to southwestern Bhutan.

Behaviour and ecology 
The Tarai gray langur is arboreal, mainly terrestrial, diurnal, folivorous, and lives in multi-male multi-female groups. Groups have been observed feeding in orchards and crop fields outside of Rajaji National Park.

References

Tarai gray langur
Mammals of Bhutan
Mammals of India
Mammals of Nepal
Monkeys in India
Fauna of Sikkim
Near threatened animals
Near threatened biota of Asia
Tarai gray langur
Taxa named by R. I. Pocock